Coleophora alabardata is a moth of the family Coleophoridae. It is found in Armenia.

References

alabardata
Moths described in 1994
Moths of Asia